Arinn Young  (born July 10, 1996)  is a Canadian 4.5 point wheelchair basketball player who won a gold medal at the 2014 Women's World Wheelchair Basketball Championship in Toronto.

Biography
Arinn Young was born in St. Albert, Alberta, on July 10, 1996. She is nicknamed "Juice" due to her practice of drinkling juice boxes during a game. She started playing basketball when she was five years old, and went on to win 15 MVP awards and two city championships. She also played other sports, including lacrosse and horse riding, and was placed third in shot-put at the Alberta Track and Field Provincial Championship.

An injury while playing lacrosse when she was 14 saw her right knee swell up. It apparently returned to normal but "popped" a number of times over the following year. An MRI revealed an anterior cruciate ligament injury. Her meniscus was damaged and her femur, patella and fibula were bone on bone, which causes accelerated wear on the bones. A series of surgical procedures followed. She continued playing basketball with the Morinville Community High School Lady Wolves until 2013, when she severely injured her good knee in the opening game at the North Central Zone Tournament.

Young was introduced to wheelchair basketball by Max MacMillan, a friend of her father's and a wheelchair basketball coach whose daughter played the sport. Able to walk normally, Young is classified as a 4.5 point player.

She began playing for the Edmonton Inferno in 2012, placing fourth in the Canadian Wheelchair Basketball League Women's National Championship in Richmond, British Columbia, and finished first in the Canadian Women's Championship in Edmonton in 2013. In 2013, she was named to the All Star Five. She joined the U25 national team in 2013, and made her international debut with the senior women's team as the youngest player on the team at the 2014 Women's World Wheelchair Basketball Championship in Toronto in July 2014, winning a gold medal. She won silver at the 2015 Parapan American Games in August 2015.

Notes

External links
 Interview: Arinn Young (Canada) | 2014 IWBF Women's World Wheelchair Basketball Championships
 
 

Living people
1998 births
Canadian women's wheelchair basketball players
Sportspeople from St. Albert, Alberta
Wheelchair basketball players at the 2016 Summer Paralympics
Wheelchair basketball players at the 2020 Summer Paralympics
Paralympic wheelchair basketball players of Canada
Basketball people from Alberta